Crete Township is located in Will County, Illinois. As of the 2010 census, its population was 23,774 and it contained 10,286 housing units. Washington Township was formed from a portion of Crete.

Geography

Cities, towns, villages
Crete
Park Forest (small portion)
Sauk Village (small portion)
Steger (southwest third)
University Park (small portion)

Other Communities
Plum Valley
Goodenow
Willowbrook

Demographics
The population as of 2016 was 23,530.

Notable people
 Emma Clara Schweer, former tax collector of Crete Township and the oldest elected official in the United States

References

External links
City-data.com
Will County Official Site
Illinois State Archives

Townships in Will County, Illinois
Townships in Illinois
1849 establishments in Illinois